Motown, or the Motown sound, is a style of  rhythm and blues music  named after the record company Motown in Detroit, where teams of songwriters and musicians produced material for girl groups, boy bands, and solo singers during the 1960s and early 1970s. The music of Motown helped a small record company become the largest black American-owned enterprise in the country and a national music industry competitor in the United States.

Overview
The sound, a sophisticated strain of R&B and pop, is known for its polished songwriting with "candid" vocal delivery. Musicians involved in the production of a Motown track constituted a mix of eclectic musical backgrounds, such as jazz and rhythm and blues. It had a crossover appeal and it was called "clean R&B that sounded as white as it did black." Productions featured a strong rhythm, layered instrumental sound, prominent percussion, an emphasis on melodious warmth, and memorable, often cheerful hooks, utilizing large bands, strings, powerful brass, pianos and organs. Motown producers adhered to the "KISS principle" (keep it simple, stupid).

Principal architects of the style were the songwriting trio Holland–Dozier–Holland and record producer Berry Gordy. Their series of hits produced for solo singers as well as groups dominated the American and British charts in the late 1960s and exerted an influence on music in the United Kingdom. Some of the components of the music, such as the "gospel break" and four-on-the-top beat (inverted), survived in disco later in the 1970s.

Smokey Robinson describes the style in the following way:
Marvin Gaye who is often credited with shaping the sound of Motown is also called "Prince of Motown".

Notes and references

American styles of music
Music of Detroit
1960s in American music